Average life expectancy in France at birth was 81 years in 2008. A new measure of expected human capital calculated for 195 countries from 1990 to 2016 and defined for each birth cohort as the expected years lived from age 20 to 64 years and adjusted for educational attainment, learning or education quality, and functional health status was published by the Lancet in September 2018. France had the ninth highest level of expected human capital with 25 health, education, and learning-adjusted expected years lived between age 20 and 64 years.

Healthcare issues in France

Obesity in France

Even though French are among the thinner Europeans (see chart below), obesity in France has been increasingly cited as a major health issue in recent years. It is now considered a political issue whereas just a few years prior it would only have been an issue reported on television talk shows or in women's magazines. However, France is only placed as the 128th fattest country in the World, one of the lowest ranked among developed countries. French food has long been studied for its health benefits.

Public health

Water supply and sanitation

France, as all EU countries, is under an EU directive to reduce sewage discharge to sensitive areas. In 2006, France was only 40% in compliance, one of the lowest achieving countries in the EU with regard to this waste-water treatment standard

Vaccination
In France, the High Council of Public Health is in charge of proposing vaccine recommendations to the Minister of Health. Each year, immunization recommendations for both the general population and specific groups are published by the Institute of Epidemiology and Surveillance. Since some hospitals are granted additional freedoms, there two key people responsible for vaccine policy within hospitals: the Operational physician (OP), and the Head of the hospital infection and prevention committee.

Mandatory immunization policies on BCG, diphtheria, tetanus, and poliomyelitis began in the 1950s and policies on Hepatitis B began in 1991. Recommended but not mandatory suggestions on influenza, pertussis, varicella, and measles began in 2000, 2004, 2004, and 2005, respectively. According to the 2013 INPES Peretti-Watel health barometer, between 2005 and 2010, the percentage of French people between 18 and 75 years old in favor of vaccination dropped from 90% to 60%.

Since 2009, France has recommended meningococcus C vaccination for infants 1–2 years old, with a catch up dosage up to 25 years later. French insurance companies have reimbursed this vaccine since January 2010, at which point coverage levels were 32.3% for children 1–2 years and 21.3% for teenagers 14–16 years old.  In 2012, the French government and the Institut de veille sanitaire launched a 5-year national program in order to improve vaccination policy. The program simplified guidelines, facilitated access to vaccination, and invested in vaccine research. In 2014, fueled by rare health-related scandals, mistrust of vaccines became a common topic in the French public debate on health. According to a French radio station, as of 2014, 3 to 5 percent of kids in France were not given the mandatory vaccines. Some families may avoid requirements by finding a doctor willing to forge a vaccination certificate, a solution which numerous French forums confirm. However, the French State considers "vaccine refusal" a form of child abuse. In some instances, parental vaccine refusals may result in criminal trials. France's 2010 creation of the Question Prioritaire Constitutionelle (QPC) allows lower courts to refer constitutional questions to the highest court in the relevant hierarchy. Therefore, criminal trials based on vaccine refusals may be referred to the Cour de Cassation, which will then certify whether the case meets certain criteria. In May 2015, France updated its vaccination policies on diphtheria, tetanus, acellular pertussis, polio, Haemophilus influenzae b infections, and hepatitis B for premature infants. As of 2015, while failure to vaccinate is not necessarily illegal, a parent's right to refuse to vaccinate his or her child is technically a constitutional matter. Additionally, children in France cannot enter schools without proof of vaccination against diphtheria, tetanus, and polio. French Health Minister, Marisol Touraine, finds vaccinations "absolutely fundamental to avoid disease," and has pushed to have both trained pharmacists and doctors administer vaccinations. Most recently, the Prime Minister's 2015–2017 roadmap for the "multi-annual social inclusion and anti-poverty plan" includes free vaccinations in certain public facilities. Vaccinations within the immunization schedule are given for free at immunization services within the public sector. When given in private medical practices, vaccinations are 65% reimbursed.

See also
 Health care in France

References